Pierre André Clémenti (28 September 1942 – 27 December 1999) was a French actor.

Life and career
Born in Paris to an unknown father and Rose Clémenti, a Corsican concierge whose surname he took, Clémenti had a difficult childhood and took refuge in literature and the theatre. He studied drama and began his acting career in the theatre. He secured his first minor screen roles in Yves Allégret's  Jack of Spades ("Chien de pique", 1960), performing alongside Eddie Constantine. Possibly his best remembered role was as the gangster lover/client of the bourgeois prostitute (Catherine Deneuve) in Belle de jour (1967) directed by Luis Buñuel, in whose other film The Milky Way (1969) he played the Devil. He worked with several other European directors, including highly regarded films of the era, such as The Leopard (Luchino Visconti, 1963), Pigsty (Pier Paolo Pasolini, 1969)  and The Conformist (Bernardo Bertolucci, 1970, and Bertolucci's Partner, 1968). Other directors he worked with include Liliana Cavani, Glauber Rocha, Miklós Jancsó, Jacques Rivette, and Philippe Garrel.

In 1972, Clémenti's career was derailed after he was sentenced to prison for allegedly possessing or using drugs. Due to insufficient evidence, he was released after 17 months; later he wrote a book about his time in prison. After his release he played the ever-optimistic sailor of the Potemkin in Dusan Makavejev's Sweet Movie (1974)  and the role of Pablo, the seductive saxophone player, in Fred Haines's Steppenwolf (also 1974) adapted from the novel by Hermann Hesse. Throughout his career he continued to be active in the theatre.

Clémenti was also involved with the French underground film movement, directing several of his own films which often featured fellow underground filmmakers and actors. Visa de censure no X was an experimental work composed of two films. New Old was a feature-length work starring Viva released in 1978. He went on to direct La Révolution ce n'est qu'un début, continuons le combat, In the Shadow of the Blue Rascal and Sun.

He married actress Margareth Clémenti (née Le-Van, 1948), mother of his son Balthazar, born in July 1965. Later he was married to Nadine, mother of his second child, Valentin Clémenti-Arnoult.

He died of liver cancer in 1999.

Selected filmography

Bibliography
1973 Carcere italiano. Milan: Il Formichiere.
2005 Quelques messages personnels. Paris: Gallimard. 
2007 Pensieri dal carcere. Fagnano Alto: il Sirente.

References

External links
 
 DVD Pierre Clémenti film-maker
 Pierre Clémenti, cinéaste, by Doris Peternel

1942 births
1999 deaths
Male actors from Paris
Deaths from liver cancer
Deaths from cancer in France
French male stage actors
French male film actors
French male television actors
French people of Italian descent
20th-century French male actors